Sir Jonathan Trelawny, 2nd Baronet (ca. 1623 – 5 March 1681), of Trelawny in the parish of Pelynt in Cornwall, England, was a Member of Parliament.

Origins
He was the fourth child and eldest son and heir of Sir John Trelawny, 1st Baronet (d. 16 February 1664), Sheriff of Cornwall for 1630.

Career
He entered Parliament in 1660 as a Member of Parliament for his family's pocket borough of East Looe in Cornwall and the prestigious county seat of Cornwall in 1661. He was elected for both East Looe and Liskeard in 1679 but was not called on to choose between them, and again in 1681, but died before Parliament convened.

Marriage and children

He married Mary Seymour (1619–1680), 6th daughter of Sir Edward Seymour, 2nd Baronet (c. 1580–1659) of Berry Pomeroy in Devon, great-grandson of Edward Seymour, 1st Duke of Somerset, Lord Protector of England and eldest brother of Queen Jane Seymour (d. 1537), the third wife of King Henry VIII.
By his wife he had six sons and at least one daughter as follows:
 Captain John Trelawny (ca. 1646 – 14 May 1680), eldest son and heir apparent, a soldier killed in action at Tangier. He had no children and predeceased his father.
 Jonathan Trelawny, 2nd son, died an infant
 Sir Jonathan Trelawny, 3rd Baronet (1650–1721), 3rd and eldest surviving son and heir, destined for the priesthood, who succeeded his father in the baronetcy and became Bishop of Bristol, Bishop of Exeter and Bishop of Winchester.
 Major-General Charles Trelawny (ca. 1653 – 24 September 1731), a Member of Parliament
 William Trelawny, died unmarried
 Chichester Trelawny (d. 1694), unmarried
 Anne Trelawny, unmarried 1730, named in the wills of her brothers John & Charles. (V.O.C. page 577? s/be 477)
 Brigadier-General Henry Trelawny (ca. 1658 – 8 January 1702), a Member of Parliament, who married Rebecca Hals (1661–1699), 5th daughter of Matthew Hals (d. 1675/6) of Efford in the parish of Eggbuckland, and of Kenedon in the parish of Sherford, both in Devon, and a co-heiress of her brother Matthew Hals (d. 1684) of Efford, from whom she inherited the manor of Efford.
Mary Trelawny

References

|-

1620s births
1681 deaths
People from Pelynt
Baronets in the Baronetage of England
Members of the pre-1707 English Parliament for constituencies in Cornwall
Politicians from Cornwall
English MPs 1660
English MPs 1661–1679
English MPs 1680–1681